Children of Sanchez is the sixteenth overall album by jazz artist Chuck Mangione. It is also the soundtrack to the 1978 film The Children of Sanchez. Chuck Mangione won a Grammy for Best Pop Instrumental Performance for the title song, "Children of Sanchez". The title track is sung by Don Potter.

Track listing
All songs written by Chuck Mangione:

Certifications

Personnel
Musicians
 James Bradley Jr. - Drums
 Dick Decker - French horn
 Grant Geissman - Guitar
 Chuck Mangione - Flugelhorn
 Charles Meeks - Bass guitar
 Jerry Peel - French horn
 Don Potter - Vocals
 Phyllis Hyman - Vocals
 George Stimpson - French horn
 Mayo Tiana - Trombone
 Jeff Tyzik - Trumpet
 Chris Vadala - Clarinet, flute, soprano sax, tenor sax 
 Brad Warnaar - French horn
 Bill Reichenbach, Jr. - Bass Trombone
Production
 Dave Collins - Digital remastering 
 Michael Frondelli - Assistant engineer
 Mick Guzauski - Editing, engineer, mixing
 Stillman Kelly - Assistant engineer
 Donald Potter - Editing, mixing
 Larry Swist - Assistant engineer
 Jeff Tyzik - Associate producer, coordination, string arrangements
 Gerald Vinci - Concert master, editing

References

1978 soundtrack albums
Chuck Mangione albums
A&M Records soundtracks